Almon Brown Strowger (February 11, 1839 – May 26, 1902) was an American inventor who gave his name to the Strowger switch, an electromechanical telephone exchange technology that his invention and patent inspired.

Early years
Strowger was born in Penfield, New York, near Rochester, the grandson of the second settler and first miller in Penfield. Little is known about his early life. It is said that if his mother gave her children a task, Strowger and his brothers would often try to devise a machine to do the task for them.  He taught school in Penfield for a time, and served in the 8th New York Volunteer Cavalry during the American Civil War. It is believed that he fought in the Second Battle of Bull Run near Manassas, Virginia.

After the Civil War, it appears he first became a country school teacher before he became an undertaker. He is variously attributed as living in El Dorado, Kansas, or Topeka, Kansas, and finally Kansas City, Missouri. It is not clear where his idea of an automatic telephone exchange was originally conceived, but his patent application identifies him as being a resident of Kansas City, Missouri, on March 10, 1891.

Rotary dialing

Anecdotally, Strowger's undertaking business was losing clients to a competitor whose telephone-operator wife was redirecting everyone who called for Strowger. Motivated to remove the intermediary operator, he invented the first automatic telephone exchange in 1889; he received its patent in 1891. It is reported that he initially constructed a model of his invention from a round collar box and some straight pins.

Finances
While he may have come up with the idea, he was not alone in his endeavors and sought the assistance of his nephew William and others with a knowledge of electricity and money to realise his concepts. With this help the Strowger Automatic Telephone Exchange Company was formed and it installed and opened the first commercial exchange in (his then home town of) La Porte, Indiana, on November 3, 1892, with about 75 subscribers and capacity for 99. He married Susan A. (1846–1921) from Massachusetts in 1897 as his second wife. Strowger sold his patents to his associates in 1896 for $1,800 (about $59,000 in 2021) and sold his share in the Automatic Electric Company for $10,000 (about $330,000 in 2021) in 1898. His patents were subsequently sold to Bell Systems for $2.5 million in 1916 (about $63,000,000 in 2021).

The company's engineers continued development of Strowger's designs and submitted several patents in the names of its employees. It also underwent several name changes. Strowger himself seems to have not taken part in this further development. He subsequently moved to St. Petersburg, Florida, and appears to have returned to being an undertaker, as H.P. Bussey Funeral Home records report an unidentified body being moved "for Mr. Strowger" in December 1899. The same funeral home subsequently buried Strowger himself. Strowger was a man of some wealth at his death and was reported as owning at least a city block of property.

Death
He died, aged 63, of an aneurysm after suffering from anemia, at St. Petersburg, Pinellas County, Florida, and was buried in Greenwood Cemetery the next day. His grave is marked with the traditional white headstone with an inscription that reads: "Lieut. A.B. Strowger, Co. A, 8 NY Cav."

He was survived by his widow Susan A. Strowger (1846–1921). After her death in Tampa, Florida, on April 14, 1921, her obituary appeared in the St. Petersburg Times, claiming she had additional "revolutionary" Strowger designs, but she had refused to make them public while she was alive because only others would profit from her husband's designs. She had claimed that her husband had only received $10,000 for his invention, when he should have received $1,000,000.

Legacy
A bronze plaque, to commemorate his invention, was placed on his grave in 1945 by telephone company officials. Strowger was admitted to the hall of fame of the U.S. Independent Telephone Association (now called the USTA) in 1965. Apart from his invention, his name has also been given to a locomotive and a company business award.

In 2003, the Verizon Foundation awarded $4500 to Pinellas Heritage, Inc. and the Pinellas Genealogy Society in Strowger's memory. The funds were used to develop a website to impart the history of the cemetery where Strowger is buried, and to restore two Civil War memorials.  The Greenwood Cemetery project won an organization achievement award from the Florida Trust for Historic Preservation.

Patents
  Strowger switch "Automatic Telephone Exchange" March 10, 1891

See also

 Strowger switch
 Rotary dial
 Things named after Strowger
 Telephone exchange

References

Additional sources
 Katherine Wilcox Thompson, "Penfield's Past", 1960, pub. by the Town of Penfield, NY, pp 178–179
 
 
 Bell Labs, Bell Laboratories Website

External links

 The oldest Strowger switch still in commercial service today at Camp Shohola for Boys, Pennsylvania, US
 Reproduction with permission of the article Early Work on Dial Telephone Systems by R.B. Hill
 Reproduction with permission of the article The Early Years of the Strowger System by R.B. Hill
 Pinellas Genealogy Society – H.P. Bussey Funeral Home Records – with 2 entries for STROWGER, one identified as A.B. Strowger
 Master Cemetery Index – Page 746
 "Mr. Watson. Come Here. I need you.": Bell and the Invention of the Telephone
 BRT Locomotives – Almon B. Strowger
 The Strowger Telecoms Site (UK) with link to 'copyrighted' sounds
 Webpage dedicated to electromechanical telephone switching technologies
 
TCI Library - This is Automatic Electric. 1955.

1839 births
1902 deaths
People from Penfield, New York
Union Army officers
19th-century American inventors
People from Kansas City, Kansas
Deaths from aneurysm